Paul Morton was a businessman and politician.

Paul Morton may also refer to:

PJ Morton (born 1981), American R&B singer, musician and producer
Paul S. Morton (born 1950), American Baptist pastor